Maple Plain can refer to a community in the United States:

Maple Plain, Minnesota, a city
Maple Plain, Wisconsin, a town